Monash University Faculty of Law, or Monash Law School, is the law school of Monash University. Founded in 1963, it is based in Melbourne, Victoria and has campuses in Malaysia and Italy. It is consistently ranked as one of the top law schools in Australia and globally, and entry to its Bachelor of Laws (LLB) programme is highly competitive.

The Faculty of Law offers the Bachelor of Laws (LLB), with which students may combine other degrees as part of a double degree, the Juris Doctor (JD), Master of Laws (LLM) and the Doctor of Philosophy (PhD). It currently has approximately 3,914 undergraduate and postgraduate students and over 100 professors, lecturers and teaching associates.

The Faculty of Law's alumni include the former Treasurer of Australia Josh Frydenberg, the current Chief Justice of the Supreme Court of Victoria Anne Ferguson, judges of the Federal Court of Australia, Supreme Court of Victoria and Supreme Court of New South Wales, the leader of the Australian Greens Adam Bandt, the current Attorney-General of Victoria Jill Hennessy, members of the Australian Parliament, legal scholars, state politicians, prominent businesspersons, artists and media personalities.

The Monash University Law Review is the Faculty of Law's flagship academic journal.  It is managed by students and supervised by faculty advisors.

History

Foundation
In the 1950s, it had become clear that Melbourne's only law school at the time, Melbourne Law School, would soon be unable to meet the rising demand for legal education.  Although Monash University was founded to focus primarily on science and technology, it would inevitably establish a law school. The need was not considered pressing enough to make a law school a foundation faculty of the new university; however, when Melbourne Law School imposed quotas on law school candidates due to a lack of resources, a new law school was immediately needed to cater for the extra students.  The Victorian Council of Legal Education, the Chief Justice of Victoria and the Victorian Government pushed for the overnight establishment of a law school at Monash University, but this was resisted by the University's Vice-Chancellor, Sir Louis Matheson, who wanted a high quality, well-planned, original faculty of law. In the end, it was over a relatively short period of time – 5 months from October 1963 to March 1964 – that a  first-year law school curriculum was established and two teaching staff were appointed. However, when students first arrived in 1964, they did so with the knowledge that the curriculum for their later years was still being written.  A law library was established with impressive speed, after substantial book donations from two former justices of the Supreme Court of Victoria. Appropriately for a law school, the Faculty's establishment was delayed by a dispute over the interpretation of the Monash University Act, concerning when and how the University Council could set up new faculties. Following debate between Monash University, the Crown Solicitor and the Parliamentary Draftsmen, the Act was eventually amended.

Early years
David Derham was the Faculty of Law's first dean, beginning his term on 29 February 1964 after resigning his post as Professor of Jurisprudence at Melbourne Law School the day before. Derham immediately sought to depart radically from the way that law had been taught previously in Australia. His appointment was announced on a Monday, and he was reportedly outlining detailed proposals for first-year subjects by the following Friday. He drastically reworked the curriculum and teaching style which his faculty had taught at Melbourne Law School. Monash University introduced small-group teaching, interactive lectures and a curriculum which emphasised legal skills in addition to a knowledge of the law itself. Classes were taught not only by academics but also by practising members of the legal profession. According to Derham, the reason behind this approach was that the law is "not fixed and static. It moves and grows." This stood in contrast to the conventional style of teaching in other Australian law schools, in which part-time staff members would deliver lectures to a hall of students with little or no student-teacher interaction. A similar transformation later took place at the University of New South Wales in Sydney. In later years, Derham also managed to establish strong international links with law schools in North America and Europe, which continue today.

The first intake of law school students began in March 1964 with an initial enrolment of 149 students, after a lengthy selection and interview process. Seventeen of the 149 students (11.4%) were women. The four subjects in the first-year curriculum were an introductory legal subject named "The Legal System", criminal law (which was designed to introduce students to the casebook method pioneered in the United States, a British history subject focused on constitutional developments, and a subject taught either in the Faculty of Arts or the Faculty of Economics and Politics. The first lecture, on "The Legal System", was held by Derham on 9 March 1964, with all staff sitting anxiously in the front row. The first professor appointed by the Faculty of Law was Louis Waller AO, who later served as Dean.

According to the Faculty of Law's early staff members, the opportunity to develop a new and original law school excited all those involved in Monash Law School's early years. In addition to its teaching reforms, Monash also became the first law school in Australia to establish its own community legal centres, which were and continue to be run by students under the supervision of staff and other lawyers. In 1971, Monash set another precedent for Australian law schools when Enid Campbell became the first female Dean of any Law School in Australia's history.

Recent history
When Monash University expanded in the 1990s, the Faculty of Law chose not to extend itself to other campuses. Instead, it chose selectively to use Monash University's global presence to create new opportunities for international study and research. The result was the establishment and expansion of international collaboration and exchange programs with law schools around the world. Additionally, the Faculty of Law established the Malaysia Program and the Prato Program, allowing its students to complete part of their degrees at the University's campuses in Malaysia and Italy. In 2008, the Faculty of Law announced that it would begin offering a dual Master of Laws with the Washington College of Law – the first such program by an Australian law school.

The Faculty of Law has made a name for itself as a dynamic and progressive law school, in a field which has been criticised for being overly traditional and out-of-touch.  It hosts faculty-run Community Legal Centres, staffed by undergraduate law students who may undertake clinical work as part of their degrees. As a result, by the early 1990s, the Faculty of Law's undergraduate law program was regarded by some in the legal profession as superior to that of its traditional rival, Melbourne Law School.

Today the Faculty of Law has over 3,914 undergraduate and postgraduate students, and over one hundred academic staff.

Deans
David Derham (1964–1968)
Louis Waller (1969–1970)
Enid Campbell (1971)
David Allan (1971–1976)
Patrick Nash (1977–1980)
Bob Baxt AO (1980–1988)
Charles Williams (1988–1998)
Stephen Parker (1999–2003)
Arie Freiberg (2004-2012)
Bryan Horrigan (2013–present)

Admissions
Entry to the Bachelor of Laws is highly competitive, with an ATAR score of approximately 98 required for guaranteed entry in 2020.  Entry to the Juris Doctor is also competitive, with a minimum undergraduate degree grade point average of 5.0 on a 7-point scale (or equivalent experience or qualifications) or 4.0 on a 7-point scale with a minimum LSAT score of 150 required for guaranteed entry in 2021.

Rankings

The Faculty of Law is consistently ranked as one of the top law schools in Australia and the world. In 2018, it was ranked first in Australia in the Academic Ranking of World Universities. It is also consistently ranked as one of the top 40 law schools in the world, and is currently QS World University Rankings at number 40 in 2021.

Research 
Academic staff at Monash Law School publish books and journal articles across almost all areas of law. Part of this research is organised around specialist centres, including:
 The Castan Centre for Human Rights Law
 The Australian Centre for Justice Innovation
 The Centre for Commercial Law and Regulatory Studies
 Law, Health and Wellbeing
 Eleos Justice
 The Transnational Criminal Law Group
 The Feminist Legal Studies Group

The Faculty's research is further supported by eight research 'clusters': commercial and private law; criminal law and justice; family law; innovation and information law; international, European and comparative law; legal philosophy and legal theory; public law, government and regulation; and the legal profession.

Monash Centre for Regulatory Studies
The Monash Centre for Regulatory Studies is a teaching and research centre with a multidisciplinary focus, leading studies on the regulation of areas such as business, health sciences and technology. The current Director of the Centre is Graeme Hodge.

Publications
The following legal journals are based at Monash Law School:
 Monash University Law Review
 Alternative Law Journal
 Australian Journal of Legal Philosophy

Law Library

The Faculty of Law's library is split over four levels in the David Derham Law School Building. Architecturally, the building reflects the post World War II popularity of modernism. Academic staff offices surround the library. The main areas of student activity are located on the ground floor basement. The Monash Law Students' Society office (colloquially 'LSS') and the adjoining room provide LSS members and LSS officials' office space and recreation area. The Monash Law building facade is currently under development, and is predicted to be completed by April 2013. This will provide an entirely renovated building face and basement foyer, to go along with the recently renovated outdoor area at the entrance of the Faculty of Law.

The Library houses a major collection of printed and electronic material. In addition to the many online databases and e-books, its physical collection contains over 150, 000 items. Most Commonwealth jurisdiction law reports can be found, including non-official and official reports. These include law reports from Australia, New Zealand, Canada, the United Kingdom, the Pacific Island regions, the United States and Europe. A relatively large staff run the library, helping students, organising books, carrying out repair work and supervision of the law library.

Community Legal Services
Monash was among the first law schools in Australia to incorporate Community Legal Services into its teaching programs.  Currently, the Faculty of Law runs two Community Legal Services. The Monash-Oakleigh Legal Service, which includes the Family Law Assistance Program, is located just outside the western border of the University's Clayton Campus. The Springvale Monash Legal Service, including the South East Centre Against Sexual Assault, is located in the South-Eastern Melbourne suburb of Springvale. The Springvale service is now the oldest continually running community legal service in Australia.  Among the students who were first to participate in the program in 1973 include the current Chief Justice of Victoria Marilyn Warren and current Chairman of the Australian Securities & Investments Commission (ASIC) Tony D'Aloisio.

These centres operate to provide free legal services and education to meet the needs of the community. They are supervised by full-time and part-time qualified legal practitioners, but are essentially run by law students at the Faculty of Law. Working at one of these centres for a semester or a summer is part of the Faculty of Law's Professional Practice units, which are credited towards the Bachelor of Laws. Student volunteers undertake a range of responsibilities, including interviewing clients, negotiating with other parties, letter drafting, preparing wills and court documents, and appearing in court on their client's behalf. Although most tasks are carried out by the students, they are under the supervision of practising solicitors. The Centres provide legal advice in areas such as criminal law, employment law, debt and family law. They also produce publications on law reform.

Since the establishment of Community Legal Services in the early 1970s, similar programs have been introduced at other Australian law schools.

Notable alumni

The Faculty of Law has produced a large number of prominent alumni across different areas of law, politics, business, academia, sport and the arts. The following is a selection of notable alumni:

Federal Court of Australia judges
 Stewart Anderson (2019–present)
 Mordy Bromberg (2009–present)
 Jennifer Davies (2013–present)
 Raymond Finkelstein AO (1997–2011)
 Christopher Jessup (2006–2017)
 Shane Marshall AM (1995–2015)
 Debra Mortimer (2013–present)
 Bernard Murphy (2011–present)
 Tony Pagone (2013–2018)

Victorian Court of Appeal judges
 David Beach (2008–present)
 Anne Ferguson, Chief Justice of Victoria (2017–present)
 Stephen Kaye AM (2003–present)
 Murray Kellam AO (1998–2009), also first President of the Victorian Civil and Administrative Tribunal
 Maree Kennedy (2016–present)
 Cameron Macaulay (2010–present)
 Richard Niall (2017–present), also Solicitor-General of Victoria (2015–2017)
 Pamela Tate (2010–present), also first female Solicitor-General of Victoria (2003–2010)
 Marilyn Warren AC, first female Chief Justice of Victoria (2003–2017) and former Lieutenant-Governor of Victoria
 Mark Weinberg AO (2008–2018), also former Chief Justice of Norfolk Island and 2nd Commonwealth Director of Public Prosecutions (1988–1991)

Victorian Supreme Court judges
 Richard Attiwill (2021–present)
 Kevin Bell (2005–2020), also former President of the Victorian Civil and Administrative Tribunal
 Anthony Cavanough (2009–present)
 Matthew Connock (2019–present)
 Clyde Croft AM (2009–2019)
 Michael Croucher (2013–present)
 Jennifer Davies (2009–2013)
 Jane Dixon (2016–present)
 James Dudley Elliott (2013–present)
 James Judd (2008–2018)
 Andrew Keogh (2016–present)
 Lex Lasry AM (2007–2018)
 Steven Moore (2018–present)
 Stuart Morris (2003–2007), also former President of the Victorian Civil and Administrative Tribunal
 Lisa Nichols (2019–present)
 Tony Pagone (2007–2013)
 Jack Rush (2013–2016)
 Kathryn Stynes (2020–present)
 Andrew Tinney (2018–present)
 Andrea Tsalamandris (2022–present)

Judiciary of New South Wales
 Elizabeth Fullerton: Judge of the Supreme Court of New South Wales (2007–present)
 Simon Molesworth AO, QC: Acting Judge of the Land and Environment Court of New South Wales (2017–present), Vice Chancellor's Professorial Fellow at the Faculty of Law, Adjunct Professor of the La Trobe Institute for Social and Environmental Sustainability and chairman of the Australia Council of National Trusts

High Court of Hong Kong
 Kevin Zervos: Judge of Court of Appeal (2013–present)

Other judges
 Ken Barlow: Judge of the District Court of Queensland (2019–present)
 Anna Boymal: Judge of the Federal Circuit Court of Australia (2019–present)
 Diana Bryant: 3rd Chief Justice of the Family Court of Australia (2004–2017); former and first Chief Magistrate of the Federal Magistrates' Court of Australia
 Jennifer Coate: Judge of the Family Court of Australia (2013–2019); State Coroner of Victoria (2007–2013); first President of the Children's Court of Victoria (2000–2007)
 Julie Condon: Judge of the County Court of Victoria (2017–2019)
 Paul Cronin: Judge of the Family Court of Australia (2006–2019)
 Ronald Curtain: Judge of the Federal Circuit Court of Australia (2012–present)
 Sarah Dawes: Judge of the County Court of Victoria (2018–present)
 Kevin Doyle: Judge of the County Court of Victoria (2019–present)
 Robert Dyer: Judge of the County Court of Victoria (2014–present)
 Mandy Fox: Judge of the County Court of Victoria (2018–present)
 Ian Gray: current State Coroner of Victoria (2012–current), first President of the Children's Court of Victoria and Chief Magistrate of the Magistrates' Court of Victoria (2001–2012)
 Felicity Hampel: Judge of the County Court of Victoria
 Lisa Hannan: Chief Magistrate of the Magistrates' Court of Victoria (2019–present)
 Justin Hannebery: Judge of the County Court of Victoria (2020–present)
 Norah Hartnett: Judge of the Family Court of Australia (2019–present)
 Scott Johns: Judge of the County Court of Victoria (2018–present)
 Sharon Johns: Judge of the Family Court of Australia (2013–present)
 Graeme Johnstone: State Coroner of Victoria (1994–2007)
 Gregory Lyon: Judge of the County Court of Victoria (2016–present)
 Kirsty Macmillan: Judge of the Family Court of Australia (2011–present)
 Martine Marich: Judge of the County Court of Victoria (2018–present)
 Patricia Matthews: Associate Judge of the Supreme Court of Victoria (2020–present)
 Alistair McNab: Judge of the Federal Circuit Court of Australia (2016–present)
 Nahum Mushin AM: Judge of the Family Court of Australia (1990–2011)
 Patrick O'Shannessy: Judge of the Federal Circuit Court of Australia (2020–present)
 David Purcell: Judge of the County Court of Victoria (2020–present)
 Claire Quin: Judge of the County Court of Victoria (2013–present)
 Patricia Riddell: Judge of the County Court of Victoria (2017–present)
 Michael Rozenes AO: Chief Judge of the County Court of Victoria (2002–2015), also Commonwealth Director of Public Prosecutions (1992–1997)
 Christopher Ryan: Judge of the County Court of Victoria (2018–present)
 David Sexton: Judge of the County Court of Victoria (2018–present)
 Meryl Sexton: Judge of the County Court of Victoria (2001–present)
 Richard Smith: Judge of the County Court of Victoria (2013–present)
 Joanne Stewart: Judge of the Federal Circuit Court of Australia (2013–present)
 Christine Thornton: Judge of the Family Court of Australia (2013–2018)
 Jack Vandersteen: Judge of the County Court of Victoria and President of the Children's Court of Victoria (2021–present)
 Peter C. Young: Judge of the Family Court of Australia (2002–2013)

Other legal practitioners
 Greg Barns SC: barrister and human rights advocate
 Anna Brown: former director of Legal Advocacy at the Human Rights Law Centre
 Julian Burnside AO QC: prominent barrister, human rights advocate and author
 John Cain: Victorian Solicitor for Public Prosecutions and State Coroner
 Kristine Hanscombe QC: barrister specialising in public law
 Emily Madder: General Counsel and Company Secretary of Siemens
 Ross Ray QC: prominent barrister and former President of the Law Council of Australia
 Neil Rees: former Chairman of the Victorian Law Reform Commission, foundation Dean of the University of Newcastle Law Faculty
 Julian McMahon AC QC: prominent barrister and human rights advocate
 David Vadiveloo: human rights advocate and screen producer
 Brian Walters AM QC: prominent barrister and advocate for human rights and the environment

Australian politics and government

 Jan Adams AO PSM: Australian Ambassador to Japan (October 2020–present) and Australian Ambassador to China (2016–2019)
 Richard Alston AO: President of the Liberal Party of Australia (2014–2017) and Australian High Commissioner to the United Kingdom (2005–2008)
 Kevin Andrews: Liberal minister and member of the Australian Parliament for Menzies (1991–present) and Father of the Australian House of Representatives (2016–present)
 Adam Bandt: Leader of the Australian Greens (2020–present) and member of the Australian Parliament for Melbourne
 Julia Banks: Liberal member of the Australian Parliament for Chisholm (2016–2019); General Counsel of Kraft Foods Australia (1992–2009), GlaxoSmithKline Australia (2009–2014) and George Weston Foods (2014–present)
 Mark Birrell: Liberal minister and member of the Victorian Legislative Council for the East Yarra Province (1983–2002)
 Peter Cleeland: Labor member of the Australian Parliament for McEwen (1984–1990)
 Peter Costello AC: longest-serving Treasurer of Australia (1996–2007) and former Deputy Leader of the Liberal Party of Australia
 Simon Crean: Leader of the Opposition and Australian Labor Party Leader (2001–2003)
 Will Fowles: Labor member of the Victorian Legislative Assembly for Burwood (2018–present)
 Josh Frydenberg: Treasurer of Australia and Deputy Leader of the Liberal Party of Australia (2018–2022)
 Deborah Glass: Victorian Ombudsman (2014–present)
 David Gray: Labor member of the Victorian Legislative Assembly for Electoral district of Syndal (1982–1985)
 Alan Griffiths: Labor member of the Australian Parliament for Division of Maribyrnong (1983–1996)
 Dianne Hadden: independent member of the Victorian Legislative Council (2004–2006)
 Jill Hennessy: 54th Attorney-General of Victoria (2018–present)
 Sarah Henderson: Liberal senator for Victoria (2019–present)
 Graham Ihlein: Labor member of the Victorian Legislative Assembly for Sandringham (1982–1985)
 Michael Kroger: President of the Victorian Liberal Party (1987–2018)
 Julian Hill: Labor member of the Australian Parliament for Bruce (2016–present)
 John Lenders: Treasurer of Victoria (2007–2010)
 Tony Lupton: Victorian Cabinet Secretary (2007–2010)
 Clem Newton-Brown: Liberal member of the Victorian Legislative Assembly for Prahran
 David O'Brien: National member of the Victorian Legislative Council for the Western Victoria Region (2010–2014)
 Brendan O'Connor: Labor minister and member of the Australian Parliament (2004–present)
 Clare O'Neil: Labor member of the Australian Parliament for Hotham (2013–present); also youngest female mayor of a local government area in Australia's history
 Martin Pakula: Labor minister and member of the Victorian Legislative Assembly (2006–present), also 53rd Attorney-General of Victoria (2014–2018)
 Victor Perton: Liberal member of the Victorian Legislative Assembly (1988–2006)
 Peter Reith: Liberal minister and member of the Australian Parliament for Flinders (1984–2001); Executive Director of the European Bank for Reconstruction and Development (2003–2009)
 Bill Shorten: Leader of the Australian Labor Party and Leader of the Opposition (2013–2019), former National Secretary, Australian Workers' Union and Victorian State ALP President
 Laura Smyth: Labor member of the Australian Parliament for La Trobe (2010–2013)
 Murray Thompson: Liberal member of the Victorian Legislative Assembly for Sandringham (1992–2018) and footballer for Richmond Football Club (1973–1976)
 John Thwaites: Deputy Premier of Victoria (1999–2007)
 Dean Wells: Attorney-General of Queensland (1989–1995)
 Steve Wettenhall: Labor member of the Queensland Parliament for Barron River (2006–2012)
 Gabrielle Williams: Labor minister and member of the Victorian Legislative Assembly (2014–present)
 Beth Wilson: Victorian Health Services Commissioner (1997–2012) and former President of Victoria's Mental Health Review Board
 Keith Wolahan: Liberal member of the Australian Parliament for Menzies

Non-Australian political figures

 Donald Betts: Democratic member of the Kansas Senate (2004–2009)
 Siswo Pramono: Indonesian Ambassador to Australia (2021–present)
 Peter Reith: Executive Director of the European Bank for Reconstruction and Development (2003–2009)
 M. A. Sumanthiran: member of the Parliament of Sri Lanka (2015–present)

Business

 Andrew Bassat: CEO and co-founder of Seek Limited
 Gidon Bromberg: director of EcoPeace Middle East
 Tony D'Aloisio: Chairman of the Australian Securities & Investments Commission (ASIC) (2007–2011) and managing director and CEO of the Australian Securities Exchange (2004–2006)
 Mina Guli: businesswoman and former deputy chairman of the Australian Chamber of Commerce and Industry in Beijing
 Tan Le: Technology entrepreneur, 1998 Young Australian of the Year
 Amanda McKenzie: CEO and co-founder of the Climate Council and environmental activist
 Liddy Nevile: technology pioneer and author
 Andrew Norton: director at the International Institute for Environment and Development
 Graeme Samuel AO: chairman of the Australian Competition & Consumer Commission (2003–2011)
 Carol Schwartz AO: Director of the Reserve Bank of Australia
 Jonathan Shier: managing director of the Australian Broadcasting Corporation (2000–2001)
 Anna Skarbek: businesswoman in the areas of environment and reduction of carbon emissions
 Alex Waislitz: prominent businessman and member of Collingwood Football Club board of directors

Academia

 Antony Anghie: Professor of Law at the National University of Singapore Faculty of Law and leading international law scholar
 Mark Aronson: Emeritus Professor at Melbourne Law School and the UNSW Faculty of Law and distinguished public law scholar
 Neil H. Buchanan: Professor at University of Florida Levin College of Law and tax law scholar
 Tim Costello AO: Director of World Vision Australia
 Clyde Croft AM: professor of law at the Faculty of Law
 Mick Dodson: 2009 Australian of the Year and Convenor of the ANU Institute for Indigenous Australia
 Hugh Evans: Co-Founder of The Oaktree Foundation, Author and Philanthropist, 2004 Young Australian of the Year, 
 Arie Freiberg: Emeritus Professor and former Dean of the Faculty of Law (2004–2012)
 Robert Hayes: Associate Professor of Law at Western Sydney University
 Peter Hogg QC: leading scholar on Canadian constitutional law
 Sarah Joseph: human rights scholar and Director of the Castan Centre for Human Rights Law
 Rosemary Langford: Associate Professor of Law at Melbourne Law School
 Ron McCallum: Emeritus Professor at the University of Sydney and foundation Blake Dawson Waldron Professor in Industrial Law at Sydney Law School
 Alexandra Phelan: faculty member and researcher at the Georgetown University School of Medicine
Charles Robert Williams, Emeritus Professor at the Faculty of Law and criminal law scholar

Literature, media and the arts

 Tom Ballard: comedian and radio presenter at Triple J (2007–2013)
 John Burns: radio presenter and former Victorian Crown Prosecutor
 Elizabeth Eggleston: author, activist for Indigenous Australians and first doctoral candidate at the Faculty of Law
 Jon Faine AM: prominent Melbourne radio personality
 David Francis: award-winning novelist
 Vance Joy: award-winning singer and songwriter
 Elliot V. Kotek: award-winning producer, filmmaker, social impact entrepreneur and journalist
 Gina Liano: barrister, television personality and star in The Real Housewives of Melbourne
 Campbell McComas: comedian and actor
 Charlie Pickering: comedian
 Elliot Perlman: writer, Three Dollars, The Reasons I Won't Be Coming), AFI Award winner
 Andrew Probyn: journalist at the Australian Broadcasting Corporation
 Aamer Rahman: comedian and member of Fear of a Brown Planet
 Sandra Sdraulig AM: chairman of the Adelaide Film Festival and the Adelaide Festival of Ideas
 Nick Russell: actor and producer
 John Spooner: author and journalist
 Matt Tilley: comedian and radio personality
 Jane Turner OAM: actress, comedian and Logie Award-winning comedy writer, co-star of Kath & Kim
 Andrew Wailes: conductor, music director and former president of the Australian Intervarsity Choral Festival
 Wendy Zukerman: science journalist and podcaster

Sport
Anna Millward (née Wilson): cyclist, two-time world champion (1999 and 2001)
Dean Kino: former Cricket Australia administrator
Peter Moore: footballer for Collingwood Football Club (1974–1982) and Melbourne Football Club (1983–1987), and dual Brownlow Medallist
Bo Nixon: footballer for Collingwood Football Club (2004) and Hawthorn Football Club (2005)
Ian Prendergast: general counsel and chief commercial officer of Carlton Football Club and footballer for the same club (2001–2006)
Daniel Trenton: Australian taekwondo champion and silver medallist at the 2000 Summer Olympics in Sydney
Peter Winter: decathlete and silver medallist at the 1994 Commonwealth Games in Canada

Notable academic staff
Notable academic staff at the Faculty of Law, past and present, include:

 Jean Allain: professor of international law and expert on modern slavery
 Bob Baxt AO: scholar and solicitor in commercial law, former Chairman of the Trade Practices Commission (now the ACCC), former Dean of the Faculty of Law
Maureen Brunt AO: distinguished economist
Enid Campbell AC: scholar in constitutional law and administrative law.
Stephen Charles AO: former Justice of the Supreme Court of Victoria, Adjunct Professor at the Faculty of Law
Clyde Croft AM: former Justice of the Supreme Court of Victoria
Sir Daryl Dawson AC KBE: former Justice of the High Court of Australia
Mark Davison: intellectual property law expert
Nadirsyah Hosen: internationally known as an expert on Indonesian law and Shari'a law
Raymond Finkelstein AO: former Justice of the Federal Court of Australia
Ian Freckelton: adjunct professor of law
Robert French AC: former Chief Justice of the High Court of Australia, Adjunct Professor at the Faculty of Law
Arie Freiberg AM: Emeritus Professor and former Dean of the Faculty of Law and Chairman of the Victorian Sentencing Advisory Council
Jeffrey Goldsworthy AM: Emeritus Professor at the Faculty of Law, legal philosopher and constitutional law scholar
Peter Gray AM: former judge of the Federal Court of Australia, Adjunct Professor at the Faculty of Law
George Hampel AM QC: former Justice of the Supreme Court of Victoria; advocacy instructor
Felicity Hampel: Judge of the County Court of Victoria
Peter Heerey AM: former judge of the Federal Court of Australia
Nadirsyah Hosen: expert on Islamic law and Senior Lecturer at the Faculty of Law
 Christopher Jessup: former judge of the Federal Court of Australia and Adjunct Professor at the Faculty of Law
Sarah Joseph: constitutional law and human rights law scholar, director of the Castan Centre for Human Rights Law
Hoong Phun Lee: Sir John Latham Professor of Law and former Deputy Dean at the Faculty of Law
Nahum Mushin AM: Adjunct Professor at the Faculty of Law, Judge of the Family Court of Australia (1990–2011)
Marcia Neave AO: former judge of the Supreme Court of Victoria
Jeremy Rapke QC: former Victorian Director of Public Prosecutions
Louis Waller AO: Emeritus Professor at the Faculty of Law and criminal law scholar
Wickrema Weerasooria: High Commissioner to Australia and New Zealand (1986–1990)
Charles Robert Williams, Emeritus Professor at the Faculty of Law and criminal law scholar
Christopher Weeramantry: Former Judge and Vice-President of the International Court of Justice

References

External links 
 Monash University Law School web site

Law schools in Australia
Law
Buildings and structures in the City of Monash
1963 establishments in Australia